Ray Domenge (born June 5, 1965) is an American retired boxer who unsuccessfully challenged Mario Veit for his 	WBO Intercontinental super middleweight title in 1999. He fought Rob Calloway for the WAA Light Heavyweight Title but lost by TKO in 1996.

He won the WAA Light Heavyweight Title in 1997 against Allen Smith by KO. He also won the WAA Middleweight Title in 1999 against Johnathan Corn. He was going for his 3rd title against Mario Veit for the WBO Inter-Continental super middleweight title but lost by the scorecards.

Domenge also fought against the legend Roberto Durán in 1996 but lost the fight due to scorecard.

Domenge's last fight was against Juergen Braehmer who knocked Domenge out in 25 seconds.

Professional boxing record

|-
|align="center" colspan=8|29 Wins (16 knockouts, 13 decisions), 13 Losses (6 knockouts, 7 decisions), 2 No Contests
|-
| align="center" style="border-style: none none solid solid; background: #e3e3e3"|Result
| align="center" style="border-style: none none solid solid; background: #e3e3e3"|Record
| align="center" style="border-style: none none solid solid; background: #e3e3e3"|Opponent
| align="center" style="border-style: none none solid solid; background: #e3e3e3"|Type
| align="center" style="border-style: none none solid solid; background: #e3e3e3"|Round
| align="center" style="border-style: none none solid solid; background: #e3e3e3"|Date
| align="center" style="border-style: none none solid solid; background: #e3e3e3"|Location
| align="center" style="border-style: none none solid solid; background: #e3e3e3"|Notes
|-align=center
|Loss
|
|align=left| Juergen Braehmer
|KO
|3
|24/11/2001
|align=left| Universum Gym, Wandsbek, Germany
|align=left|
|-
|Win
|
|align=left| Rob Bleakley
|UD
|8
|25/08/2001
|align=left| Casino Omaha, Onawa, Iowa
|align=left|
|-
|Win
|
|align=left| Richard W. Wilson
|PTS
|4
|07/04/2001
|align=left| Veteran's Coliseum, Cedar Rapids, Iowa
|align=left|
|-
|Loss
|
|align=left| Tony Marshall
|UD
|10
|26/02/2000
|align=left| Madison Square Garden, New York City
|align=left|
|-
|Loss
|
|align=left| Mario Veit
|UD
|12
|23/10/1999
|align=left| Ballsporthalle, Frankfurt, Germany
|align=left|
|-
|Win
|
|align=left| Jonathan Corn
|UD
|12
|03/09/1999
|align=left| Casino Omaha, Onawa, Iowa
|align=left|
|-
|Win
|
|align=left| Rocky Navarro
|TKO
|8
|26/06/1999
|align=left| Omaha, Nebraska
|align=left|
|-
|Win
|
|align=left| Walter Cowans
|KO
|3
|27/03/1999
|align=left| Crete Sokol Hall, Omaha, Nebraska
|align=left|
|-
|Win
|
|align=left| Danny Thomas
|PTS
|6
|20/03/1999
|align=left| Horton, Kansas
|align=left|
|-
|No Contest
|
|align=left| Jesse Aquino
|ND
|6
|19/02/1999
|align=left| Memorial Auditorium, Burlington, Iowa
|align=left|
|-
|Loss
|
|align=left| Omar Sheika
|KO
|2
|31/10/1998
|align=left| Atlantic City Convention Center, Atlantic City, New Jersey
|align=left|
|-
|Win
|
|align=left| Eric "Landlord" Davis
|UD
|8
|09/05/1998
|align=left| Casino Omaha, Onawa, Iowa
|align=left|
|-
|Loss
|
|align=left| Mads Larsen
|KO
|3
|13/02/1998
|align=left| Falconer Scenen, Copenhagen, Denmark
|align=left|
|-
|Win
|
|align=left| Allen Smith
|KO
|4
|20/09/1997
|align=left| Casino Omaha, Onawa, Iowa
|align=left|
|-
|No Contest
|
|align=left| Allen Smith
|NC
|2
|14/06/1997
|align=left| Casino Omaha, Onawa, Iowa
|align=left|
|-
|Loss
|
|align=left| Rob Calloway
|TKO
|9
|02/04/1997
|align=left| Station Casino, Kansas City, Missouri
|align=left|
|-
|Win
|
|align=left| Frank Minton
|TKO
|9
|06/09/1996
|align=left| Casino Omaha, Onawa, Iowa
|align=left|
|-
|Win
|
|align=left| Carlos Vasquez
|TKO
|2
|01/06/1996
|align=left| Casino Omaha, Onawa, Iowa
|align=left|
|-
|Loss
|
|align=left| Roberto Durán
|UD
|10
|20/02/1996
|align=left| Mahi Temple Shrine Auditorium, Miami, Florida
|align=left|
|-
|Win
|
|align=left| Darrell Miller
|KO
|2
|19/09/1995
|align=left| Omaha, Nebraska
|align=left|
|-
|Win
|
|align=left| Heath Todd
|PTS
|8
|03/08/1995
|align=left| Omaha, Nebraska
|align=left|
|-
|Win
|
|align=left| Reggie Strickland
|PTS
|6
|12/05/1994
|align=left| Omaha, Nebraska
|align=left|
|-
|Win
|
|align=left| Tommy Degen
|KO
|2
|05/02/1994
|align=left| Veteran's Coliseum, Cedar Rapids, Iowa
|align=left|
|-
|Loss
|
|align=left| Ray Close
|TKO
|4
|16/10/1993
|align=left| Kings Hall, Belfast
|align=left|
|-
|Win
|
|align=left| Donald Hudson
|KO
|1
|07/10/1993
|align=left| Yellow Rose, Iowa
|align=left|
|-
|Win
|
|align=left| Jay Clark
|TKO
|6
|05/08/1993
|align=left| Council Bluffs, Iowa
|align=left|
|-
|Win
|
|align=left|John Stevens
|KO
|2
|17/06/1993
|align=left| Council Bluffs, Iowa
|align=left|
|-
|Win
|
|align=left| Jim McClain
|TKO
|1
|20/05/1993
|align=left| Lincoln, Nebraska
|align=left|
|-
|Loss
|
|align=left| Henry Wharton
|TKO
|3
|07/04/1993
|align=left| Leeds, Yorkshire
|align=left|
|-
|Win
|
|align=left| Jesse Abrams
|MD
|10
|28/11/1992
|align=left| North Platte, Nebraska
|align=left|
|-
|Loss
|
|align=left| Tony Menefee
|SD
|12
|02/05/1992
|align=left| Lincoln, Nebraska
|align=left|
|-
|Win
|
|align=left| Jim Farr
|PTS
|6
|14/11/1991
|align=left| Omaha, Nebraska
|align=left|
|-
|Loss
|
|align=left| Antoine Fernandez
|PTS
|8
|14/08/1991
|align=left| La Seyne-sur-Mer, Var
|align=left|
|-
|Loss
|
|align=left| Tocker Pudwill
|PTS
|4
|01/08/1991
|align=left| Butte, Montana
|align=left|
|-
|Win
|
|align=left| Al Bell
|TKO
|3
|23/05/1991
|align=left| Omaha, Nebraska
|align=left|
|-
|Win
|
|align=left| Richard W. Wilson
|TKO
|5
|18/02/1991
|align=left| Peony Park, Omaha, Nebraska
|align=left|
|-
|Win
|
|align=left| Steve Langley
|UD
|10
|29/11/1990
|align=left| Peony Park, Omaha, Nebraska
|align=left|
|-
|Win
|
|align=left| Anthony Campbell
|PTS
|4
|15/08/1990
|align=left| Peony Park, Omaha, Nebraska
|align=left|
|-
|Loss
|
|align=left| Steve Langley
|PTS
|6
|09/06/1990
|align=left| Kansas City Memorial Hall, Kansas City, Kansas
|align=left|
|-
|Win
|
|align=left| Jeff Gettemy
|TKO
|3
|19/05/1990
|align=left| Nebraska State Fair, Lincoln, Nebraska
|align=left|
|-
|Win
|
|align=left| Anthony Campbell
|PTS
|4
|30/04/1990
|align=left| Peony Park, Omaha, Nebraska
|align=left|
|-
|Win
|
|align=left| Jerry Williamson
|KO
|2
|21/02/1990
|align=left| Omaha, Nebraska
|align=left|
|-
|Win
|
|align=left| Jesse Abrams
|PTS
|4
|05/12/1989
|align=left| Carter Lake, Iowa
|align=left|
|-
|Win
|
|align=left| Isaac Quarless
|TKO
|1
|24/07/1989
|align=left| Omaha, Nebraska
|align=left|
|}

See also
 List of boxing triple champions

References

External links
 

1965 births
Living people
Boxers from Nebraska
Light-heavyweight boxers
Super-middleweight boxers
Middleweight boxers
Sportspeople from Omaha, Nebraska
American male boxers